Choteau Airport  is a public use airport located one nautical mile (2 km) northeast of the central business district of Choteau, a city in Teton County, Montana, United States. The airport is owned by the city and county. It is included in the National Plan of Integrated Airport Systems for 2011–2015, which categorized it as a general aviation airport.

Although many U.S. airports use the same three-letter location identifier for the FAA and IATA, this facility is assigned CII by the FAA but has no designation from the IATA.

Facilities and aircraft 
Choteau Airport covers an area of 495 acres (200 ha) at an elevation of 3,947 feet (1,203 m) above mean sea level. It has two asphalt paved runways: 14/32 is 5,000 by 75 feet (1,524 x 23 m) and 5/23 is 3,700 by 60 feet (1,128 x 18 m).

For the 12-month period ending July 22, 2011, the airport had 3,100 aircraft operations, an average of 258 per month: 87% general aviation, 10% air taxi, and 3% military. At that time there were 12 aircraft based at this airport: 92% single-engine, and 8% ultralight.

References

External links 
 3 Rivers Aircraft Management Services at Choteau Airport
 
 

Airports in Montana
Transportation in Teton County, Montana